The 1888 Wimbledon Championships took place on the outdoor grass courts at the All England Lawn Tennis Club in Wimbledon, London, United Kingdom. The tournament ran from 9 July until 16 July. It was the 12th staging of the Wimbledon Championships, and the first Grand Slam tennis event of 1888.

Champions

Men's singles

 Ernest Renshaw defeated  Herbert Lawford, 6–3, 7–5, 6–0

Women's singles

 Lottie Dod defeated  Blanche Hillyard, 6–3, 6–3

Men's doubles

 Ernest Renshaw /  William Renshaw defeated  Patrick Bowes-Lyon /  Herbert Wilberforce, 2–6, 1–6, 6–3, 6–4, 6–3

References

External links
 Official Wimbledon Championships website

 
Wimbledon Championships
Wimbledon Championships
Wimbledon Championships
July 1888 sports events